Same Girl is the seventh studio album by a Korean jazz vocalist, Na Yoon-Sun, released on 17 August 2010 in Germany. The album contains eleven songs by Na Yoon-Sun. The styles of the album are Korean, North/East Asian Traditions. The album is her second release as a leader of ACT Music, after spending a decade with a French band. The materials from sources are as diverse as Randy Newman, Sergio Mendes, and Metallica. She kept the same ensemble as she worked on "Voyage" - guitarist Ulf Wakenius, bassist Lars Danielsson and percussionist Xavier Desandre Navarre. With her talents in treating each syllable in acrobatics and other vocal techniques recorded in "Same Girl" reinforces her reputation.

Na shows her sense of humor in many of the tracks. In her song, "Pancake", she talks about how much she likes to consume her favorite fast foods like ice cream, donuts and milkshake. Her interpretation of Randy Newman's "Same Girl" is a solo performance that carries a genuine emotion. Na arranges a Korean traditional folk song in this album, and create a mass version of Kangwondo Arirang. Then she does again in her next album, Lento, with a title, Arirang, which she performs in a closing ceremony Sochi Winter Olympic in 2014. Na sings in her "Song of No Regrets" with  Lars Danielsson's cello. The song "Moondog" by Terry Cox contains Na's kazoo solo, Ulf Wakenius's guitar and  Xavier Desandre Navarre's drum. She also shows her scat style in her song, "Breakfast in Bagdhad".

Commercial performance
The "Same Girl" remains number 1 in the jazz charts in France. The album also reached to the top 40 of the pop charts. She has been awarded the French Gold Award for selling 50,000 copies.
The album reached #38 in France and # 89 in Germany.
She also received the  ECHO, 2011 for Best International Jazz Vocalist of the Year. The "Same Girl" clearly got a full attention in France. She has been awarded the French Gold Award for selling 50,000 copies.

Track listing

Personnel
 Na Yoon-Sun - Vocal, Producer, Singer-Songwriter, Kalimba, Kazoo
 Roland Brival - Narration Special Guest on track 11 
 Lars Danielsson - Bass, Cello
 Xavier Desandre Navarre - Percussion 
 Ulf Wakenius - Guitar
 Axel Matignon and Lars Danielsson - Recording producers
 Jae Jin In - Executive Producer Hub Music Inc.

References

2010 albums
Na Yoon-sun albums